Kukka Nature Reserve is a nature reserve which is located in Hiiu County, Estonia.

The area of the nature reserve is 169 ha.

The protected area was founded in 1998 on the basis of Kukka Landscape Conservation Area.

References

Nature reserves in Estonia
Geography of Hiiu County